Cruise & Maritime Voyages (CMV) was a British passenger shipping company headquartered in Purfleet, Essex, United Kingdom. The company ceased operations in 2020 and entered administration.

History
Cruise & Maritime Voyages was formed in 2009, by parent organisation Cruise & Maritime Services International, after their German based Transocean Tours (for whom they were the UK representative) filed for bankruptcy.

Cruise & Maritime Voyages positioned itself as "Providing ex-UK 'no fly' cruising holidays aboard smaller and medium-sized classic and more traditional style ships." The company served an adult market, with an onboard style of traditional entertainment, dining and rooms using a fleet of older vessels.

In March 2020, due to the COVID-19 pandemic, Cruise & Maritime Voyages temporarily halted operations, with the majority of ships laid up in Tilbury. The  was also inspected by the Agency but was not detained.

Sky News reported on 15 July 2020 that the company was facing insolvency and was in talks with VGO Capital Management, which Sky described as "a special situations investor with expertise in the shipping industry", for additional financing. The company had previously sought a financing agreement with private equity firm Novalpina Capital; this attempt failed after Barclays declined to offer the company a state-backed loan. Attempts to secure financing failed, and the company, including its German subsidiary, entered administration with Duff & Phelps Ltd. on 20 July 2020, with all trading ceased and all sales offices closed with immediate effect.

It was reported on 19 August 2020 that the company's ships were actively for sale on the secondhand market, and that the Administrators were "said to be struggling with crew repatriation." In November, at an auction sale, the company's fleet (excepting Astoria, which the company operated under charter from Bank Montepio of Lisbon) was sold for US$ 23,419,000.

Fleet
The following ships were operated or were scheduled to be operated by Cruise & Maritime Voyages.

References

External links
 
 MS Ocean Countess on Chris' Cunard Page https://www.chriscunard.com/history-fleet/cunard-fleet/1960-today/cunard-countess/

Defunct cruise lines
2010 establishments in the United Kingdom
Transport companies established in 2010
2020 disestablishments in the United Kingdom
Transport companies disestablished in 2020
Companies that have entered administration in the United Kingdom